Schistura maejotigrina is a species of stone loach, a freshwater fish, from northern Thailand.

The species was first described in 2012. From the Ping River drainage in the northern Chao Phraya River basin, fish of about 5 cm length were found in a stream near a waterfall and terraced rice fields. The specimens were collected in fast flowing, clear water over a substrate of sand and gravel.

References

maejotigrina
Fish of Thailand
Taxa named by Apinun Suvarnaraksha
Fish described in 2012